Sun Moon University is a university located in Asan, Chungcheongnam-do, South Korea.

Sport
The university's football team participated in the 2014 IFA Shield tournament.

Notable people
Oh Jung-se, actor.
Kim Jong-woo, South Korean footballer.
Jo Hyeon-woo, South Korean footballer.

References

External links
Sun Moon University

Cheonan
Unification Church affiliated organizations
Private universities and colleges in South Korea
Universities and colleges in South Chungcheong Province
Educational institutions established in 1986
1986 establishments in South Korea